Rhiwbina Rugby Football Club is a Welsh rugby union club based in Rhiwbina, a suburb of Cardiff in Wales.  Rhiwbina RFC is a member of the Welsh Rugby Union and is a feeder club for the Cardiff Blues.

Rhiwbina RFC also runs a mini and Junior Section with teams from Under 7's up to Youth.

History

The club was established on 14 February 1962, when a notice was put up in a Post Office window in Rhiwbina by Jack Treeby. Jack asked for interested people to a meeting and following this meeting the club was formed.

The "Squirrel" name and logo came about as a result of the newly formed club meeting in the Butchers Arms, an Ansells pub which used the squirrel motif as an emblem.

Rhiwbina Rugby was awarded full Welsh Rugby Union (WRU) status in 1975, the nominator's included Pontypridd and Penarth Rugby clubs.

Rhiwbinas previous President was Keith Rowlands, who was also the President of the WRU and who played for Wales and the British Lions.

Rhiwbina has in recent years enjoyed success on and off the field. There were wholesale change of the committee in 2008, this saw the club head in an exciting new direction, with a new enthusiasm. The introduction of the experienced new coaching team of Gareth Lintern and Jared Lougher saw a turn around of fortunes on the pitch. Back to back promotions in 2010/11 and 2011/12 saw the club narrowly miss out on a third promotion in 2012/13. In 2013 there was the opening by WRU CEO Roger Lewis of new changing rooms and floodlights, this proved a worthwhile addition to the club. In the following season Rhiwbina RFC won the Div 2 East title gaining promotion to Div 1. During this season there was an appearance at the Millennium Stadium in the final of the SWALEC Plate competition. The team narrowly lost to Merthyr 29-26. In the same season there was a first appearance in the Silver Ball Final. 
James Bird a Rhiwbina RFC product gained international honor's with the USA in 2016.  With three senior sides, a youth team and a thriving mini and junior teams the future for Rhiwbina RFC looks bright.

Notable former players
  Sam Warburton
  Gareth Delve
  Nick Macleod
  James Goode
 James Bird (USA)

Club honours
WRU Division Five South East 2006/07 - Champions (Perfect season P18 W18 D0 L0)
WRU Division Four South East 2010/11 - Champions
East District Cup 2010/11 - Winners
WRU Division Three South East 2011/12 - Runners Up
SWALEC WRU Division Two East 2013-2014 Champions
SWALEC Plate 2013-2014 Runners up
Brains Smooth Silver Ball 2013-2014 Runners up
SWALEC Division One East 2014/15 Runners up

See also
 Rugby union in Wales
 Rugby in Cardiff

References

Welsh rugby union teams